Garamur Jugi Pathar is a village located in the Majuli district, in the northeastern state of Assam, India.

Demography
In the 2011 census, Missamora had 485 families with a population of 2,248, consisting of 1,164 males and 1,084 females. The population of children aged 0–6 was 287, making up 12.77% of the total population of the village. The average sex ratio was 931 out of 1000, which is lower than the state average of 958 out of 1000. The child sex ratio in the village was 828 out of 1000, which is lower than the average of 962 out of 1000 in the state of Assam.

References

Villages in Majuli district